Sequeiró is a former civil parish in the municipality of Santo Tirso, Portugal. In 2013, the parish merged into the new parish Areias, Sequeiró, Lama e Palmeira. It is located 3 km north of the city of Santo Tirso.

References

Former parishes of Santo Tirso